"Endless Summer Nights" is a song written and performed by American rock singer Richard Marx released in January 1988 as the third single from his eponymous debut album. The song peaked at #2 on the U.S. pop and Adult Contemporary charts.

Background and composition
"Endless Summer Nights" was a track from Marx's original demo tapes. It begins with a similar intro beat style as "It Must Have Been Love" by Roxette. 
The lyrics were inspired by a trip to Hawaii that Marx had taken with his then-girlfriend (and future wife), Cynthia Rhodes. 
According to Marx, he wrote the song as a theme to summer love that does not last when lovers go their separate ways in the fall. 
In the liner notes of his 1997 Greatest Hits album, Marx commented on the song: "Aside from replacing synthesized bass with the great Nathan East, this recording is the demo that every record company in the business rejected in 1985 and 1986." Marx eventually signed with EMI-Manhattan Records in 1986.

Release and reception
Released in January 1988 as the third single from his debut solo album, "Endless Summer Nights" entered the U.S. Billboard Hot 100 at #53, the highest debut of the week. In March and April, the song reached #2, where it stayed for two weeks. 
The single also peaked at #2 on the U.S. Adult Contemporary chart, behind "Never Gonna Give You Up" by Rick Astley. 
Elsewhere, the single reached #13 in Sweden, #19 in Australia, #42 in New Zealand, #50 in the United Kingdom, and #62 in the Netherlands.
The woman in the music video is French model and actress Myrtille Blervaque (born September 1962). Also going by the stage names Blair Valk and Borovnisa Blervaque, she also appeared in the Eddie Money music video for his 1988 top-10 hit "Walk On Water". She got the name Myrtille, which means "blueberry" in French, due to her being a breech baby, as she was suffocating at birth and her face turned purple-blue. Myrtille was married to actor Sam Jones from 1987 to 1990. Jones played the title character in the 1980 film "Flash Gordon" and the title character in the TV series "The Highwayman" from 1987 to 1988.

Track listing
"Endless Summer Nights" [edit] (Marx) – 4:11
"Have Mercy" [live at the Palace in L.A.] (Marx) – 5:30

Credits 
 Richard Marx – lead and backing vocals
 Tom Keane – keyboards
 Michael Landau – guitar
 Bruce Gaitsch – guitar
 Nathan East – bass
 John Keane – drums
 Paulinho da Costa – percussion
 Dave Boruff – saxophone

Chart performance

Year-end charts

Other versions
Soul singer Dorothy Moore performed a cover version of "Endless Summer Nights" on her 1988 album Time Out for Me. 
Smooth jazz saxophonist Dave Koz, who accompanied Marx on his first tour, included his rendition on his eponymous 1990 debut solo album. 
Jawaiian trio Ekolu recorded a cover of the song on their 2009 album Ekolu Music II: Anthem.

References

External links
"Endless Summer Nights" lyrics

1980s ballads
1988 singles
Rock ballads
Richard Marx songs
Songs written by Richard Marx
1987 songs
Manhattan Records singles